Hyperthymic temperament, or hyperthymia, from Ancient Greek ὑπέρ ("over", meaning here excessive) + θυμός ("spirited"), is a proposed personality type characterized by an exceptionally, or in some cases, abnormally positive mood and disposition. It is generally defined by increased energy, vividness and enthusiasm for life activities, as opposed to dysthymia. Hyperthymia is similar to but more stable than hypomania.

Characteristics of the hyperthymic temperament include:
 increased energy and productivity
 short sleep patterns
 vividness, activity extroversion
 self-assurance, self-confidence
 strong will
 extreme talkativeness
 tendency to repeat oneself
 risk-taking/sensation seeking
 breaking social norms
 very strong libido
 love of attention
 low threshold for boredom
 generosity and tendency to overspend
 emotion sensitivity
 cheerfulness and joviality
 unusual warmth
 expansiveness
 tirelessness
 irrepressibility, irresistible, and infectious quality

The clinical, psychiatric understanding of hyperthymia is evolving. Studies have suggested that hyperthymic temperament may be associated with efficient performance of complex tasks under time pressure or extreme conditions.  Despite this positive characterization, hyperthymia can be complicated with depressive episodes manifesting as a softer form of bipolar illness, such as cyclothymia. Research also suggests a familial genetic connection of the temperament to bipolar I.

Aside from references in historical and more recent writings on the spectrum of mood disorders, further literature on the temperament is lacking. There is a lack of agreement on its definition, implications or whether it is pathological. It is not known where to place hyperthymia on the affective spectrum.

Hyperthymia manifesting intermittently or in an unusual way may mask hypomania or another psychiatric disorder.

See also
 Euthymia (medicine) - stable, pleasant, tranquil, "normal" mood
 Happiness
 Bipolar disorder
 Unipolar mania

References

Further reading

Personality